Lesley Howarth (born 29 December 1952) is a British author of children's and young adult fiction. For the novel Maphead, published by Walker Books in 1994, she won the annual Guardian Children's Fiction Prize, a once-in-a-lifetime book award judged by a panel of British children's writers, and she was a runner-up for the Carnegie Medal.

Howarth was born in Bournemouth, England.

Reviewers including Philip Pullman have remarked upon Howarth's ability to "humanize" highly technical or unusual subjects, a tendency which she calls "the romance of hard things".

Works 

 The Flower King (1993)
 MapHead (1994)
 Weather Eye (1995)
 The Pits (1996)
 Fort Biscuit (1996), illustrated by Ann Kronheimer
Welcome to Inner Space (1997)
 MapHead 2 (1997); US title, Maphead: the return
 Quirx : The Edge of the World (1998)
Bad Rep (1998), illus. Mark Oliver
 Paulina (1999)
Yamabusters (1999)
 The Squint (1999), illus. Jeff Cummins
 Aliens for Dinner (1999)
 Mister Spaceman (2000)
 I Managed a Monster (2000)
No Accident (2000)
 Ultraviolet (2001)
 Carwash (2002)
 Dade County's Big Summer (2002)
 Drive (2004)
Colossus (2004)
 Calling the Shots (2006)
 Bodyswap: The Boy Who Was 84 (2009)
 Tales from the Sick Bed (London: Catnip, 2009), as by L. P. Howarth 
 Tales from the Sick Bed: Brainstorms
 Tales from the Sick Bed: Fever Dreams 
 Tales from the Sick Bed: The Medicine Chest 
Swarf (2010)

Awards

 1995 Guardian Children's Fiction Award for MapHead
 1995 Carnegie Medal highly commended runner-up for MapHead
 1995 Nestlé Smarties Book Prize Ages 9–11 for Weather Eye (Joint Winner)

Howarth has also been shortlisted for numerous literary awards.

See also
 
Rob Day

Notes

References 

1952 births
British children's writers
Guardian Children's Fiction Prize winners
Living people
Writers from Bournemouth